Dugal is a surname with multiple origins. In some cases it is derived from the Gaelic personal name Dùghall (variously spelt), or else from a reduced form of the surname MacDougall (which is an Anglicised surname originating from a patronymic form of Dùghall, Dubhghall, etc.). The Gaelic Dùghall and Dubhghall are composed of elements dubh and gall, meaning "dark" and "stranger." Fingal is a Gaelic name which means "fair stranger."

In other cases, the surname Dugal is of French origin. In other cases, the surname is of Punjabi origin, as a Khatri and Sikh name based upon the name of a Khatri clan. This Indian surname is more often spelt Duggal.

Dugal is also a surname of a Marathi family originally given by the rulers of the Peshwa dynasty meaning the third line people in the war.